M'Chedallah is a town and commune in Bouïra Province, Algeria. According to the 1998 census it has a population of 21,593.

References

Communes of Bouïra Province
Algeria
Cities in Algeria